Zeist is the capital and largest town of the municipality of Zeist. Another name for the town is ''Mooi Zeist'' which means Beautiful Zeist in English. The town is located in the Utrecht province of the Netherlands, east of the city of Utrecht.

History 

The town of "Seist" was first mentioned in a charter in the year 838. The original settlement was located at the present Dorpsstraat. In the late 12th century, a church was built here. Its tower is now a part of the Reformed Church, the remainder of which was built in the 19th century. Until medieval times, a branch of the river Rhine flowed close to the centre of the town. Three mansions were built near the village: the Huis te Zeist, Kersbergen, and Blikkenburg.

From 1677 to 1686, the "Slot Zeist" was built on or near the ruins of "Kasteel Zeist", the original castle (donjon) of Rodgar van Zeist. There is very little documentation on the family that lived there, but a few names are found: in the 12th century a Godefridus de Seist and in the late 13th century another Godefridus, a knight, with his son Johannes and his daughter Petronilla. (Bronnen voor de geschiedenis van Zeist, deel 1, ed. Van Hinsbergen) The last member of the van Zeist family was a woman, Elisabeth (?), who married a member of the Borre van Amerongen family. They had a son who adopted his mother's name and his father's coat-of-arms.

In the last quarter of the 17th century, Count Willem Adriaan van Nassau, an illegitimate descendant of Prince Maurice of Orange, acquired the property and built Slot Zeist in the Dutch Classicist style. Murals by Daniel Marot are still largely intact. Members of the Evangelische Broedergemeente (Evangelical Brethren's Congregation), the Dutch name for the Moravians, settled in Zeist in 1746, building for their community an impressive array of 18th century Classicist houses planned around two squares. Their headquarters are still located in the centre of town, next to "the palace". The oldest Dutch archives of the Moravians are kept at the Utrecht Archival Centre at Utrecht.

In the 19th century, Zeist became a favorite residence for the rich, mainly from the city of Utrecht.

Camp New Amsterdam, (vliegbasis Soesterberg) a former Royal Netherlands Air Force military airbase near this town, was the venue for the Pan Am Flight 103 bombing trial to take place outside the UK, but under Scots law. The court was designated the Scottish Court in the Netherlands.

Organisations and surroundings 

Zeist is the location of the Royal Dutch Football Association (KNVB), the Royal Dutch Korfball Association (KNKV) and the International Korfball Federation(IKF). It is also known for the forests surrounding the town. For many years the Dutch National Archaeological Research Service (Rijksdienst voor het Oudheidkundig Bodemonderzoek) was housed at Slot Zeist.

Notable people 

The following notable persons were born in Zeist:

 Guido Verbeck (1830–1898) political adviser, educator and missionary, worked as a foreign adviser in Japan
 Hermann Snellen (1834–1908) ophthalmologist invented the Snellen chart
 Anthon van Rappard (1858–1892) painter and draughtsman
 Willem Pijper, (1894–1947) composer, music critic and music teacher
 Hendrik Marsman, (1899–1940) poet and writer
 Isaäc Arend Diepenhorst, (born 1916) former minister of education
 Johan Witteveen (1921–2019) politician and MD of the International Monetary Fund (IMF) 1973-1978 
 Carel Blotkamp (born 1945) artist, art historian, writer and critic
 Wam Kat, (born 1956) political activist and author 
 Mark Overmars, (born 1958) author of GameMaker Studio
 Jan van de Pavert (born 1960) sculptor, painter, draftsman, animator, and video artist
 Mirjam Sterk (born 1973) former politician, civil servant and educator

Sport 

 Henk Kamerbeek (1893–1954) hammer thrower, competed at the 1924 and 1928 Summer Olympics 
 André Bolhuis (born 1946) a retired field hockey player, competed at the 1972 and 1976 Summer Olympics
 Bert Blyleven, (born 1951) Major League Baseball Hall of Fame pitcher
 Guusje van Mourik (born 1955) karateka, judoka and boxer
 Jos Ruijs (born 1955) rower, competed in the 1976 Summer Olympics
 Chima Onyeike (born 1975) football coach and former professional player with 257 caps 
 Jeroen Rauwerdink (born 1985) volleyball player
 Eva de Goede (born 1989) field hockey player, gold medalist in the 2008, 2012 and 2020 Summer Olympics, and silver medallist at the 2016 Summer Olympics

Transport 

Zeist has two railway stations. Driebergen-Zeist railway station is located between Zeist and Driebergen-Rijsenburg, to the south of Zeist. It is on the Amsterdam–Arnhem railway. Den Dolder railway station is located in Den Dolder. It is on the Utrecht–Kampen railway and the Den Dolder–Baarn railway.
Zeist also has a two major bus hubs, one on the Jordanlaan en one at Handelscentrum. Both have 6 and 4 lines going through respectively.

Gallery

See also 

 Zeist (municipality)
 Utrecht
 Utrecht (province)
 Utrecht (municipality)

References

External links 

 
 
 Website

Zeist
Populated places in Utrecht (province)
Cities in the Netherlands